Roulette is the fourth studio album by English boy band Blue, released on 25 January 2013. The album was preceded by the release of the lead single, "Hurt Lovers", on 4 January 2013, and also includes the band's Eurovision entry single, "I Can". The album was released in Germany and certain other European territories on 25 January. It was released in the United Kingdom on 28 April 2013. The album was re-released on 4 November 2013 in the form of a deluxe tour edition, containing a bonus disc featuring a number of remixes of tracks from the album. The band embarked on the European Roulette Tour from May to December 2013 in promotion of the album.

Background
Blue began recording new material in July 2010. They revealed during an interview in March 2011 that they had recorded a collaboration with American R&B superstar Bruno Mars for their upcoming, fourth studio album. Discussing the record with Digital Spy, Lee Ryan said: "We've been writing with Ne-Yo, and I've written at least a couple of songs on my own that will probably make the album. We've also been working with Bruno Mars on a song called 'Black & Blue' – he's sending his parts over from a demo we recorded a while ago. It's got some haunting notes on the chorus." They also revealed that three tracks on the album had been produced by RedOne, and that they felt that the material was "their best work to date". During February 2012, the band embarked on a small tour across Manila, performing with fellow boyband A1 and Jeff Timmons in three special concerts, two of which included the Smart Araneta Coliseum on 25 February 2012, and the Singapore Indoor Stadium on 28 February. The tour was billed as "Boybands: The Greatest Hits Tour".

On 22 June 2012, the band premiered their new single, "Hurt Lovers", during a concert in China. In an interview shortly after the concert, the band claimed that "Hurt Lovers" was one of the first tracks they recorded after re-uniting, and that it was an obvious choice for their comeback single. The track was co-written by the band, along with Jez Ashurst, David Jost, Martin Schmidt and Alexander Zuckowski. It received positive reception across Asia, before being officially premiered in Germany on 6 October 2012. The creators of the film  approached the band, and asked if the song could be used as the official theme for the film. Thus, the track received an early release in Germany on 4 January 2013, before being released across the world later in the year. In promotion of the single, the band performed it live on Vocea României on 4 December 2012, as well as embarking on an acoustic radio tour across six cities in Germany. In October 2012, the group confirmed via their official Facebook page that the title of their fourth studio album would be Roulette. It was also revealed that the album would receive an early release in Germany, being made available from 25 January 2013. The band shot the album's artwork in a deserted casino in November 2012.

Singles
The release of Roulette was preceded by "I Can," the band's comeback single. The track served as the United Kingdom's entry for the Eurovision Song Contest 2011, which was held in Düsseldorf, Germany. It came 11th in the contest, scoring 100 points. The single was released on 1 May 2011 as a digital download, with the physical release the day after. It reached the top ten in Austria, Germany, and Switzerland and peaked at number 16 on the UK Singles Chart, becoming Blue's lowest-charting single in the United Kingdom up to then. "I Can" was later included as an international bonus track on Roulette.

On 4 January 2013, "Hurt Lovers" was released as the album's lead single in German-speaking Europe – three weeks prior to the release of Roulette there. The creators of the German film Break Up Man (2013) had approached the band, and asked if the song could be used as the official theme for the film. Thus, the track received an early release, before being released across the world later that year. While the song became another top ten success in Germany, peaking at number seven on the German Singles Chart, it reached number 70 in the United Kingdom only.

"Without You" was released as the second single from the album on 16 May 2013 only in German-speaking Europe. The music video premiered the same day. "Break My Heart" was released as the third single from the album on 29 June for radio premiere and 5 August 2013 for digital download. The single was released as official single only in Germany and promotional radio single on United Kingdom. The music video was premiered on 18 August. The song was released as the third single in the United Kingdom as part of the Roulette Summer Edition EP on 2 September 2013. "Broken" and "Ayo" were released as the fourth and fifth single in the United Kingdom and Ireland on 2 February 2014. The music video for "Broken" premiered on 31 January 2013.

Critical reception

Stephen Unwin from Daily Express found that "one of the great things about Blue is that they can all sing, especially Lee. Another is that they can pull together a song, either among themselves or roping in an Elton John or two, that is standout good. Another is that they're likeable, even if you're not 13 and anyone that will stick to Blu-Tack will do. We don't even mind that they split up ages ago, arguably knowing that making up is the most profitable thing to do. So here they are trying to convince us that they never lost it and it's working." Renowned for Sound editor Brendon Veevers wrote that the "pop/RnB sound that is synonymous with Blue is found within almost each song that makes up Roulette. While it is great to be offered something we are familiar with in terms of Blue pennings we wonder if it is wise for the group to be so reliant on a safety net at this point in their career, particularly since it hadn’t work for them as well as they had hoped when they first made a comeback two years ago? We aren’t entirely sure it is. Regardless of this, Roulette is a fun and weighty release from Blue who may just find themselves back in the charts if they pick their singles wisely from the record."

Track listing

Notes
  signifies a co-producer
  signifies an additional producer

Charts

Release history

References

2013 albums
Blue (English band) albums
Albums produced by Cutfather